Gastineau Peak is a mountain in the city and borough of Juneau, Alaska, United States.  It is a part of the Boundary Ranges of the Coast Mountains in western North America.  It is located 1.6 miles west of Sheep Mountain and 2.4 miles southeast of the city of Juneau.

The name was already in use and noted by United States Geological Survey (USGS) official D. C. Witherspoon in 1916 and first published in 1918.  It was entered into the USGS's Geographic Names Information System on March 31, 1981.

References

Boundary Ranges
Mountains of Juneau, Alaska
Mountains of Alaska